Plicaustraconus is a subgenus of sea snails, marine gastropod mollusks in the genus Conus, family Conidae, the cone snails and their allies.

In the latest classification of the family Conidae by Puillandre N., Duda T.F., Meyer C., Olivera B.M. & Bouchet P. (2015), Plicaustraconus has become a subgenus of Conus as Conus (Plicaustraconus) Moolenbeek, 2008  (type species:Conus advertex (Garrard, 1961)) represented as Conus Linnaeus, 1758

Distinguishing characteristics
The Tucker & Tenorio 2009 taxonomy distinguishes Monteiroconus from Conus in the following ways:

 Genus Conus sensu stricto Linnaeus, 1758
 Shell characters (living and fossil species)
The basic shell shape is conical to elongated conical, has a deep anal notch on the shoulder, a smooth periostracum and a small operculum. The shoulder of the shell is usually nodulose and the protoconch is usually multispiral. Markings often include the presence of tents except for black or white color variants, with the absence of spiral lines of minute tents and textile bars.
Radular tooth (not known for fossil species)
The radula has an elongated anterior section with serrations and a large exposed terminating cusp, a non-obvious waist, blade is either small or absent and has a short barb, and lacks a basal spur.
Geographical distribution
These species are found in the Indo-Pacific region.
Feeding habits
These species eat other gastropods including cones.

 Subgenus Plicaustraconus Moolenbeek, 2008
Shell characters (living and fossil species)
The shell is obconic in shape with broad shoulders.  The protoconch is paucispiral.  The whorl tops have cords, and there is a well developed dentiform plait.  The anal notch is shallow to relatively deep, and an anterior notch is absent.  The periostracum is smooth, and the operculum is large.
Radular tooth (not known for fossil species)
The anterior section of the radular tooth is shorter than the posterior section, and the blade covers between one-third and two-thirds of the length of the anterior section.  A basal spur is present, and the barb is short.  There are one or two rows of serrations.
Geographical distribution
The species in this genus occur in the Australian and South African regions.
Feeding habits
These cone snails are presumed vermivorous, meaning that the cones prey on polychaete worms, based upon the radular tooth morphology.

Species list
This list of species is based on the information in the World Register of Marine Species (WoRMS) list. Species within the genus Plicaustraconus include:
 Plicaustraconus advertex (Garrard, 1961): synonym of  Conus advertex (Garrard, 1961)
 Plicaustraconus angasi (Tryon, 1884): synonym of  Conus angasi Tryon, 1884
 Plicaustraconus baeri (Röckel & Korn, 1992): synonym of Conus (Plicaustraconus) baeri Röckel & Korn, 1992 represented as Conus baeri Röckel & Korn, 1992
 Plicaustraconus bonfigliolii (Bozzetti, 2010): synonym of Conus bonfigliolii (Bozzetti, 2010)
 Plicaustraconus felix (Fenzan, 2012): synonym of Conus (Plicaustraconus) felix Fenzan, 2012 represented as Conus felix Fenzan, 2012
 Plicaustraconus lozeti (Richard, 1980): synonym of Conus lozeti Richard, 1980
 Plicaustraconus trigonus (Reeve, 1848): synonym of  Conus trigonus Reeve, 1848
 Plicaustraconus visagenus (Kilburn, 1974): synonym of  Conus visagenus Kilburn, 1974
 Plicaustraconus wallangra (Garrard, 1961): synonym of  Conus wallangra (Garrard, 1961)

References

Further reading 
 Kohn A. A. (1992). Chronological Taxonomy of Conus, 1758-1840". Smithsonian Institution Press, Washington and London.
 Monteiro A. (ed.) (2007). The Cone Collector 1: 1-28.
 Berschauer D. (2010). Technology and the Fall of the Mono-Generic Family The Cone Collector 15: pp. 51-54
 Puillandre N., Meyer C.P., Bouchet P., and Olivera B.M. (2011), Genetic divergence and geographical variation in the deep-water Conus orbignyi complex (Mollusca: Conoidea)'', Zoologica Scripta 40(4) 350-363.

External links
 To World Register of Marine Species
  Gastropods.com: Conidae setting forth the genera recognized therein.

Conidae
Gastropod subgenera